The 2022–23 Florida Gulf Coast Eagles men's basketball team represented Florida Gulf Coast University in the 2022–23 NCAA Division I men's basketball season. The Eagles, led by first-year head coach Pat Chambers, played their home games at Alico Arena in Fort Myers, Florida as members of the ASUN Conference. They finished the season 17–15, 7–11 in ASUN play to finish in a tie for ninth place. As the No. 10 seed in the ASUN tournament, they lost to Queens in the first round.

Previous season 
The Eagles finished the 2021–22 season 21–11, 10–6 to finish in third place in the East division in ASUN play. They defeated North Alabama in the first round of the ASUN tournament before losing to Bellarmine in the quarterfinals. They received an invite to The Basketball Classic, formerly known as the CollegeInsider.com Tournament. They defeated Detroit Mercy in the first round of the tournament before losing to Coastal Carolina in the second round.

On March 5, 2022, the school fired Michael Fly as head coach. On March 14, the school named former Penn State head coach Pat Chambers the team's new head coach.

Preseason 
In the conference's preseason poll, the Eagles were picked to finish in fourth place.

Roster

Schedule and results 

|-
!colspan=9 style=| Non-conference regular season

|-
!colspan=9 style=| ASUN regular season

|-
!colspan=12 style=| ASUN tournament

|-

Source

References

Florida Gulf Coast Eagles men's basketball seasons
Florida Gulf Coast
Florida Gulf Coast
Florida Gulf Coast